The discography of American country artists George Jones and Tammy Wynette contains the recordings they made as a vocal duo. Their discography includes nine studio albums, 14 compilation albums, 15 singles and one music video. In October 1971, the duo's first studio album was released by Epic Records and was titled We Go Together. It peaked at number three on the American Billboard Top Country Albums chart and number 169 on the Billboard 200 list. Included on the disc was the duo's first single, "Take Me". It reached the top ten on the American Billboard Hot Country Songs chart and the top 20 on the Canadian RPM Country Tracks chart. It was followed by their second studio album called Me and the First Lady, which charted at number six on the Billboard country list. Featured on the disc was their second top ten single, "The Ceremony".

Jones and Wynette's third studio recording was a gospel disc titled We Love to Sing About Jesus (1972), which featured the top 40 single, "Old Fashioned Singing". In 1973, Epic issued two studio albums of the duo's material: Let's Build a World Together and We're Gonna Hold On. The latter disc's title track was the pair's first number one single on the Billboard country chart. Between 1974 and 1975, three singles were issued by the Jones-Wynette duo. Of the three, its most successful was 1974's "We Loved It Away". It peaked in the Billboard country top ten and was included on their sixth studio album, George & Tammy & Tina. The latter included Wynette's daughter, Tina. In 1976, Epic issued the pair's seventh studio disc titled Golden Ring. It was their only album to top the Billboard country albums chart. The disc included the number one Billboard singles: "Golden Ring" and "Near You". Both singles also charted on the RPM country chart, with "Near You", topping the chart.

Jones and Wynette reunited sporadically over the next two decades to record and perform. In 1977, the new single, "Southern California", was included on their Greatest Hits album. The single itself reached number five on the Billboard country chart. In 1980, the duo returned for the recording of their eighth studio album, Together Again. Included on the disc was the single, "Two Story House". The track was a number two Billboard country hit and a number one RPM country hit. Jones and Wynette recorded for the final time in 1995 and released the album, One. The disc peaked at number 12 on the Billboard country chart while also being their first to chart on the RPM Country Albums list. It included the chart single, "One", which also featured a corresponding music video.

Albums

Studio albums

Compilation albums

Singles

Music videos

See also
George Jones albums discography
George Jones singles discography
Tammy Wynette albums discography
Tammy Wynette singles discography

References 

Country music discographies
Discographies of American artists